Graphiocephala polysticha is a moth of the family Gracillariidae. It is known from South Africa and Zimbabwe.

References

Gracillariinae
Lepidoptera of South Africa
Lepidoptera of Zimbabwe
Moths of Sub-Saharan Africa